The following is a list of prime ministers of Mozambique, since the establishment of the office of Prime Minister of Portuguese Mozambique in 1974.

The current prime minister is Adriano Maleiane. He assumed the office on 3 March 2022.

Prime ministers of Mozambique (1974–present)

|- style="text-align:center;"
! colspan=8| Portuguese Mozambique

|- style="text-align:center;"
! colspan=8| People's Republic of Mozambique
|- style="text-align:center;"
| colspan=8| Post abolished (25 June 1975 – 17 July 1986)

|- style="text-align:center;"
! colspan=8| Republic of Mozambique

See also

Mozambique
List of presidents of Mozambique
List of colonial governors of Mozambique
List of heads of the National Resistance Government of Mozambique
Lists of office-holders
List of current heads of state and government

Sources
 http://rulers.org/rulm2.html#mozambique
 http://www.worldstatesmen.org/Mozambique.htm
 African States and Rulers, John Stewart, McFarland
 Guinness Book of Kings, Rulers & Statesmen, Clive Carpenter, Guinness Superlatives Ltd
 Heads of State and Government, 2nd Edition, John V da Graca, MacMillan Press 2000

References

Mozambique, List of prime ministers of
 
Prime ministers
Prime ministers